= Arab Rider Charging =

1832 painting by Eugène Delacroix

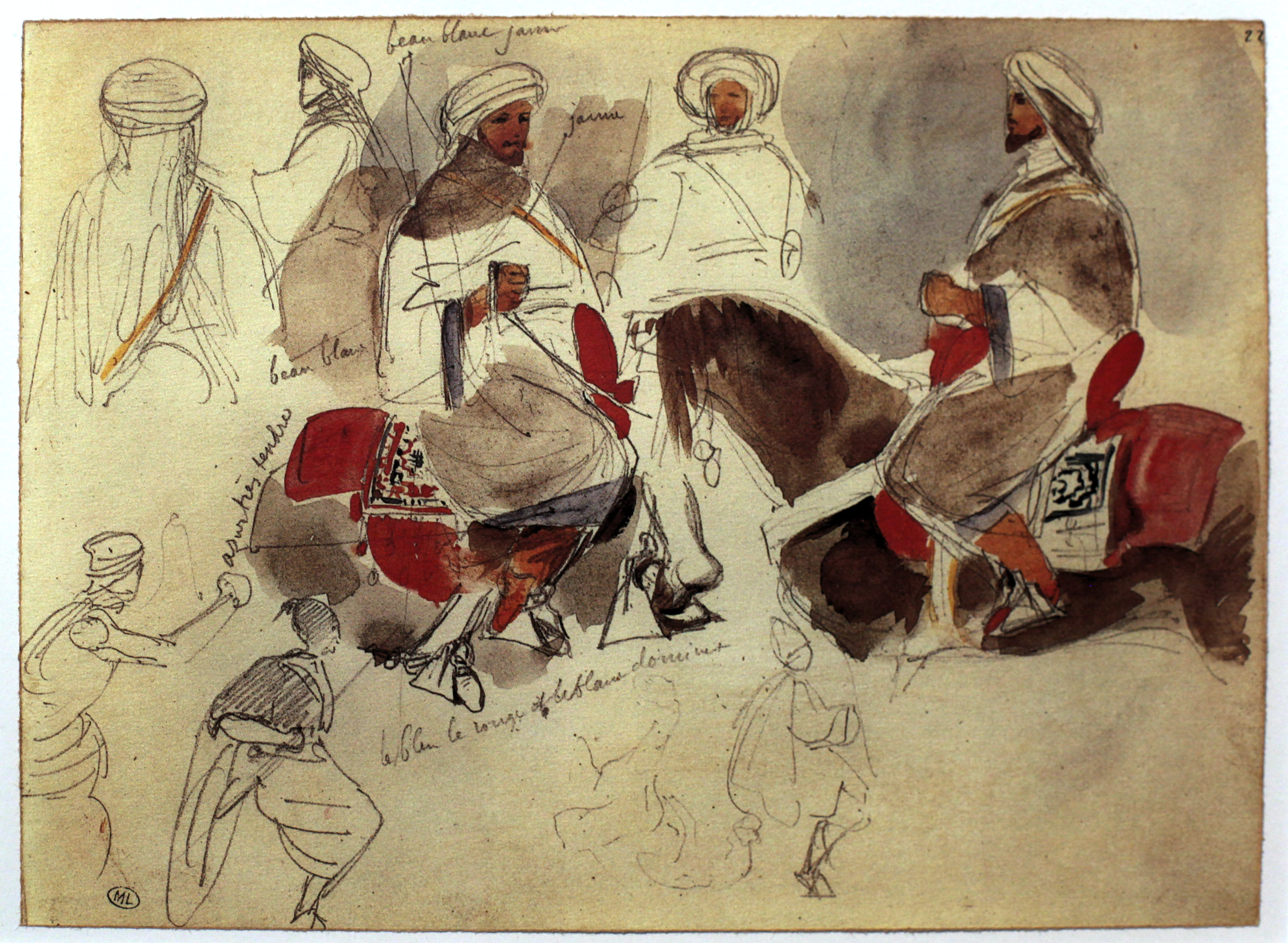
Sketch of Moroccan riders in Delacroix's travel notebook.

Arab Rider Charging is a small 1832 Orientalist oil on canvas painting by the French artist Eugène Delacroix, dated and signed by the artist. It is now in a private collection. It shows an Arab rider charging at the gallop.

No information survives on the nature of the commission or the creative process behind the work, other than the fact that Delacroix offered it directly to Jacques-Denis Delaporte, the French consul at Tangiers, and that Delacroix based the work on sketches he had made in Morocco, with the group of riders in the foreground directly copied from one of those sketches.
